Xiong Xun (died 800 BC) was from 821 to 800 BC the monarch of the state of Chu during the Western Zhou Dynasty of ancient China.  Like other early Chu rulers, he held the hereditary noble rank of viscount first granted to his ancestor Xiong Yi by King Cheng of Zhou.

Xiong Xun's father, the younger Xiong Yan, had four sons: Xiong Shuang, Xiong Xue, Xiong Kan, and Xiong Xun, the youngest.  When Xiong Yan died in 828 BC he was succeeded by his first son Xiong Shuang.  However, when Xiong Shuang died in 822 BC, the remaining three brothers fought one another for the throne.  Xiong Xun was ultimately victorious and ascended the throne, while Xiong Xue was killed and Xiong Kan escaped to Pu.

Xiong Xun reigned for 22 years until his death in 800 BC.  He was succeeded by his son Xiong E.

References

Monarchs of Chu (state)
9th-century BC Chinese monarchs
800 BC deaths
Year of birth unknown